Scott Hansen (born June 17, 1955) is an American stock car driver from Green Bay, Wisconsin. Now retired, Hansen primarily competed in the American Speed Association. He raced for several years in the NASCAR Craftsman Truck Series and Busch Series.

Background
Hansen grew up in a racing family as his father Rollie Hansen was a race car driver and the flagman in the 1960s at the Brown County fairgrounds at De Pere, Wisconsin.

Racing career

Local driver
Hansen won five late model track championships at the Wisconsin International Raceway between 1985 and 1989.

American Speed Association and ARTGO
Hansen moved to the American Speed Association (ASA) and ARTGO touring series and was the ASA series Rookie of the Year in 1989. He drove for Ken Schrader's ASA team. One ARTGO win was the 1994 National Short Track championship race at Rockford Speedway.

ARCA
He also made two spot ARCA starts in 1991; he had a seventh-place finish at the first race at Daytona and 24th at Atlanta.

NASCAR Craftsman Truck Series
He failed to qualify for a Phoenix NASCAR Craftsman Truck Series race in 1995 and Tucson race in 1997. Hansen made his first truck start for Billy Ballew Motorsports at the Milwaukee Mile in 1998; he qualified eighth in finished 24th. Hansen's second start came a month later at Indianapolis Raceway Park (IRP) when he qualified 20th and finished 24th. He started the final two races that season (Phoenix and Las Vegas) and both ended with Did Not Finish's (DNF).

Hansen teamed up with Ken Schrader full-time for the 1999 season. He started the season with a seventh-place finish at Homestead-Miami Speedway. His second top ten finish was a tenth-place finish at Bristol Motor Speedway in the ninth race. Hansen's best career NASCAR finish came at the fifteenth race; he claimed the third place at Nazareth Speedway. Hansen parted from the team with one race left in the season; he finished eighteenth in the season points.

NASCAR Busch Series
Hansen started in first Busch Series race at Gateway Motorsports Park in 1998. Schrader earlier had Hansen qualify his Busch car at Milwaukee and he had qualified the car third fastest. Schrader and his co-owner Kenny Wallace needed a driver to race for Wallace after wildfires caused the Pepsi 400 Daytona race to be postponed. Schrader tapped his ASA driver; Hansen qualified 42nd and raced his way up to 16th - the first car one lap down. Hansen failed in his attempt to qualify the car for the following race at Rockingham Speedway.

He raced in two Busch races in 1999, a 28th-place finish in his home track at Milwaukee and a 37th-place finish at IRP. Hansen made his final NASCAR start in 2001 at Memphis International Raceway finishing 37th. He failed to qualify at Rockingham later that season.

Motorsports career results

NASCAR
(key) (Bold – Pole position awarded by qualifying time. Italics – Pole position earned by points standings or practice time. * – Most laps led.)

Busch Series

Craftsman Truck Series

References

External links

Living people
1955 births
Sportspeople from Green Bay, Wisconsin
Racing drivers from Wisconsin
NASCAR drivers
ARCA Menards Series drivers
American Speed Association drivers
USAC Silver Crown Series drivers